Amphimonhystera is a genus of nematodes belonging to the family Xyalidae.

The species of this genus are found in Europe and Southern America.

Species:

Amphimonhystera anechma 
Amphimonhystera bella 
Amphimonhystera circula 
Amphimonhystera galea 
Amphimonhystera marisalbi 
Amphimonhystera molloyensis 
Amphimonhystera pallida 
Amphimonhystera parachnema 
Amphimonhystera paranechma

References

Nematodes